The men's 100 metre backstroke competition of the swimming events at the 2012 European Aquatics Championships took place May 21 and 22. The heats and semifinals took place on May 21, the final on May 22.

Records
Prior to the competition, the existing world, European and championship records were as follows.

Results

Heats
43 swimmers participated in 6 heats.

Swim-Off
The swim-off took place to determine the last semifinal participant.

Semifinals
The eight fasters swimmers advanced to the final.

Semifinal 1

Semifinal 2

Final
The final was held at 17:14.

References

Men's 100 m backstroke